Evans Marie (born March 5, 1983) is a sprinter from Seychelles. He represented Seychelles at the 2004 Summer Olympics and the 2006 Commonwealth Games.

External links
 

1983 births
Living people
Seychellois male sprinters
Olympic athletes of Seychelles
Athletes (track and field) at the 2004 Summer Olympics
Athletes (track and field) at the 2002 Commonwealth Games
Athletes (track and field) at the 2006 Commonwealth Games
Commonwealth Games competitors for Seychelles